Hassie may refer to:

 Hassie McCoy, a fictional character
 Hassie Young (born 1925), Canadian ice hockey player

See also

 Brice Assie (born 1983)
 Hasse
 Hassi
 Hassy